Paththage Visna Kaumini Fernando (born on 18 June 1991) is a Sri Lankan beauty pageant titleholder who was crowned as Miss Earth Sri Lanka 2015 and Sri Lanka's representative in Miss Earth 2015.

Biography

Education
Visna studies via External degree program of Kelaniya University while following her CBF at Institute of Bankers of Sri Lanka.

Pageantry

Miss World Sri Lanka 2014
Visna joined the Miss World Sri Lanka pageant in 2014. The pageant was won by Chulakshi Ranathunga who represented Sri Lanka in Miss World 2014 in London but declared unplaced.

Miss Earth Sri Lanka 2015
Visna once again competed in a national pageant this time through Miss Earth Sri Lanka. The pageant concentrates on the environmental awareness. The pageant was held at Citrus Waskaduwa Hotel in Colombo on 3 June 2015. She was declared as the winner. Sathma Nugera was proclaimed as first runner up while Harshani Ruman as second runner up. Miss Earth Sri Lanka 2014, Imaya Liyanage and  Miss Earth 2014 Jamie Herrell of the Philippines crowned Fernando at the end of the event.

Miss Earth 2015
Winning Miss Earth Sri Lanka for 2015, Visna is Sri Lanka's representative to be Miss Earth 2015 held on 5 December 2015 at Marx Halle in Vienna, Austria.And would try to succeed Jamie Herrell as the next Miss Earth.

Top Model of the World 2016
Sri Lanka’s representative Visna Fernando won the 2nd runner up in the Top Model of the World 2016 contest held in Bremen, Germany

References

External links
Visna Fernando at Miss Earth Sri Lanka's website

Miss Earth 2015 contestants
Sri Lankan beauty pageant winners
Living people
1991 births